Erlbach may refer to:

Erlbach, Bavaria, a municipality in the district of Altötting in Bavaria, Germany
Markt Erlbach, a municipality in the district of Neustadt (Aisch)-Bad Windsheim in Bavaria, Germany
Erlbach, Saxony, a village and former municipality in Saxony, Germany, today part of the town Markneukirchen
Erlbach-Kirchberg, a former municipality in Saxony, Germany, today part of the town Lugau
Erlbach (Rott), a river of Bavaria, Germany, tributary of the Rott